The Lorens Berg Foundation is a local history foundation in the former municipality of Andebu in Vestfold, Norway.

The foundation's purpose is to stimulate local historical work in Andebu and Vestfold. In addition, the foundation is responsible for publishing a new local history book for Andebu, operating a local history center, and running a web portal for local historical work in Andebu.

The foundation was established by the Andebu Historical Association, the municipality of Andebu, Andebu Sparebank, and the Andebu fire insurance company.

The foundation is named after the local historian and the local history book author Lorens Berg. The foundation was established in 2008.

References

External links
 Lorens Berg Foundation
 Lorens Berg at the online Kodal local history book

Andebu
Foundations based in Norway
2008 establishments in Norway
Organisations based in Sandefjord